Visitors to Kiribati must obtain a visa unless they come from one of the 73 visa exempt countries.

Kiribati signed a mutual visa waiver agreement with Schengen Area countries on 24 June 2016.

Visa policy map

Visa policy
Citizens of the following 73 countries and territories can enter Kiribati without a visa. An extension of the foreign national's stay is possible.  However, the time spent in Kiribati without a visa by a citizen of one of these countries must not exceed 4 months in any calendar year.

Holders of a Laissez-Passer issued by the United Nations traveling on duty can visit visa free.

See also

Visa requirements for Kiribati citizens

References

External links 
Visa Requirement

Kiribati
Foreign relations of Kiribati